Alexander White may refer to:

Politicians
Alexander White (Virginia politician), (1738-1804), U.S. Congressman from Virginia
Alexander White (Alabama politician), (1816-1893), U.S. Congressman from Alabama
Alexander Colwell White (1833-1906), U.S. Congressman from Pennsylvania
Alex White (politician), Irish Labour Party Senator, 2007-

Sports
Alex White (skateboarder), skateboarder
Sandy White (footballer), Scottish former footballer

Others
Alexander White (designer), British designer
Alexander Whyte (1837-1921), Scottish clergyman and teacher
Alex White (musician), musician with The Electric Soft Parade

See also
Al White (disambiguation)
Alex White (disambiguation)